The Hessenlied (Song of Hesse) is the official anthem of the German federal state of Hesse. The text was written by Carl Preser (1828-1910), the melody was composed by Albrecht Brede (1834-1920).

Lyrics

Further reading
 Angus M. Folder: Das erste bekannte Hessenlied – ein Ausdruck des patriotischen Gefühls in der Landgrafschaft Hessen um die Mitte des 15. Jahrhunderts, Hessische Heimat, 24. Jg., 1974, Issue 1, pp. 34–50

External links
  (German)

Culture of Hesse
German anthems
Songs about Germany
Year of song missing